Ang Thong is a town (thesaban mueang) in Thailand, capital of Ang Thong Province. The town covers the entirety of tambon Talat Luang and Bang Kaeo as well as parts of the tambon Sala Daeng, Ban Hae, Ban It, Pho Sa, and Yansue, all of Mueang Ang Thong District.  it had a population of 13,738. The town is on the Chao Phraya River.

History
Ang Thong was originally known as Muang Wiset Chai Chan. The original location of Muang Wiset Chai Chan was on the Noi River. Muang Wiset Chai Chan was a frontier outpost of Ayutthaya during war with the Burmese, and the site of a Burmese encampment en route to the Battle at Bang Rachan in Singburi.  During the Thonburi period, Muang Wiset Chai Chan was moved to the left bank of the Chao Phraya River at Ban Bangkaeo and was renamed "Muang Angthong."

References

External links

Populated places in Ang Thong province
Populated places on the Chao Phraya River